Okello Peter (born 19 June 1973, in Kampala) is a Ugandan-Japanese former professional boxer who competed from 1997 to 2014. He challenged for the WBC heavyweight title in 2006, and held the OPBF title from 2001 to 2006.

Professional boxing record

External links

Ugandan male boxers
1972 births
Living people
Heavyweight boxers
Sportspeople from Kampala